Karl Peter Röhl (12 September 12, 1890, Kiel – 25 November, 1975, Kiel) was a German painter and graphic artist .

Röhl undertook an apprenticeship as a painter upon leaving school in 1906. He then attended at schools of applied arts in Kiel and Berlin between 1907 and 1911 continuing his studies at the Weimar Saxon Grand Ducal Art School under Walther Klemm and Albin Egger-Lienz.

Karl Peter Röhl was enrolled as a student at the Bauhaus and went Johannes Itten preliminary lectures during his first semester. He had his own studio which in 1922, provided the venue for Theo van Doesburg’s extra-curricular De Stijl.

He joined the Nazi Party in 1933.

References

1890 births
1975 deaths
Nazi Party members